Roberto Esteban Luco Álvarez (born 3 May 1985) is a Chilean former footballer who played as a attacking midfielder.

Career
He is remembered for his spell at Santiago Wanderers.

Honours

Club
Santiago Wanderers
 Primera División de Chile (1): 2001

References

External links
 
 
 Roberto Luco at MemoriaWanderers 

1985 births
Living people
Sportspeople from Valparaíso
Chilean footballers
Chilean expatriate footballers
Santiago Wanderers footballers
Trasandino footballers
Ñublense footballers
Deportes Linares footballers
Chilean Primera División players
Tercera División de Chile players
Primera B de Chile players
Segunda División Profesional de Chile players
Chilean expatriate sportspeople in Bolivia
Expatriate footballers in Bolivia
Association football midfielders